Elaeocarpus munroi is a species of flowering plant in the Elaeocarpaceae family and is endemic to India. It was first formally described in 1838 by Robert Wight who gave it the name Monocera munroii in his book Illustrations of Indian Botany. In 1874, Maxwell T. Masters changed the name to Elaeocarpus munroi in the Hooker's Flora of British India. The specific epithet (munroi) honours the botanist, William Munro.

References

munroi
Flora of India (region)
Plants described in 1838
Taxa named by Robert Wight
Taxonomy articles created by Polbot
Taxobox binomials not recognized by IUCN